Baptae may refer to:

 The priests of Cotyttia, the festival of Cotytto, the Greek goddess of lewdness, see Baptes
 a comedy of the ancient Greek writer Eupolis in which he assailed the effeminacy and debauchery of his countrymen